James Lang (born 4 April 1995) is a Scottish professional rugby union footballer who plays as a Fly half or Centre for Edinburgh Rugby in the United Rugby Championship and the Scotland national team.

Rugby Union career

Amateur career

Born a few miles from Harlequins rugby union side's Twickenham Stoop, in Ashford, Middlesex. Lang represented Harlequins first, at school boy level. His burgeoning rugby career took off, when as a teenager Lang joined Welsh side Rygbi Gogledd Cymru (RGC1404) in North Wales.

Professional career

In the summer of 2016 the 22-year-old Lang returned from Rygbi Gogledd Cymru to Harlequins academy. He has since made several successful appearances as Fly-Half for Quins.

Characteristic of Lang's style on the rugby field is his strong and accurate kicking. Lang himself has mentioned working with former Quins Fly-half Nick Evans. Which benefited him in his own similar role. Lang plays at Fly-half in the Harlequins academy and first team.

Lang signed a pre-contract agreement with United Rugby Championship side Edinburgh Rugby in January 2021, alongside fellow Harlequins player Glen Young.

International career

Lang's first played for Scotland at U18 level in 2013. Five years later he was named as a member of the Scottish squad for the summer tour to Canada, United States and Argentina. Lang one of six uncapped players ahead of the tour, under the guidance of Scotland coach Gregor Townsend.

Lang received his first senior cap against Canada on 9 June 2018.

References

External links
Harlequins profile

1995 births
Living people
Scottish rugby union players
Harlequin F.C. players
Scotland international rugby union players
RGC 1404 players
Edinburgh Rugby players
Rugby union fly-halves
Rugby union centres
Rugby union players from Surrey